Mojave Unified School District is a school district in Eastern Kern County that serves the town of Mojave and The City of California City, California (USA).

List of schools

High schools
 California City High School
 Mojave Junior/Senior High School

Middle schools
 California City Middle School

Elementary schools
 Hacienda Elementary School
 Mojave Elementary School
 Robert P. Ulrich Elementary School

Transportation Department
MUSD's transportation department operates the oldest school bus owned by a school district in California, a 1951 Crown Supercoach. Apart from the 1951 Crown, Mojave operates an array of other Crown Supercoaches, Blue Bird All Americans, Thomas Built Rear Engines, and IC REs.

See also
List of school districts in California
Southern Kern Unified School District
Muroc Joint Unified School District

References

External links
 

School districts in Kern County, California
Mojave, California
California City, California
1951 establishments in California
School districts established in 1951